HMCS Glace Bay is a  that has served in the Canadian Forces and Royal Canadian Navy since 1996. Glace Bay is the second ship of her class which is the name for the Maritime Coastal Defence Vessel Project.  She is the second vessel to use the designation . She is assigned to Maritime Forces Atlantic (MARLANT) and is homeported at CFB Halifax.

Design and description
The Kingston class was designed to fill the minesweeper, coastal patrol and reserve training needs of the Canadian Forces, replacing the s, s and Royal Canadian Mounted Police coastal launches in those roles. In order to perform these varied duties the Kingston-class vessels are designed to carry up to three  ISO containers with power hookups on the open deck aft in order to embark mission-specific payloads. The seven module types available for embarkation include four route survey, two mechanical minesweeping and one bottom inspection modules.

The coastal defence vessels are powered by four Jeumont ANR-53-50 alternators coupled to four Wärtsilä UD 23V12 diesel engines creating . Two LIPS Z-drive azimuth thrusters are driven by two Jeumont CI 560L motors creating  and the Z drives can be rotated 360°.

The Kingston class is equipped with a Kelvin Hughes navigational radar using the I band and a Kelvin Hughes 6000 surface search radar scanning the E and F bands. The vessels carry an AN/SQS-511 towed side scan sonar for minesweeping and a Remote-control Mine Hunting System (RMHS). The vessels are equipped with one Bofors 40 mm/60 calibre Mk 5C gun and two M2 machine guns. The 40 mm gun was declared obsolete and removed from the vessels in 2014. Some of them ended up as museum pieces and on display at naval reserve installations across Canada. The Kingston-class coastal defence vessels have a complement of 37.

Service history
The ship's keel was laid down on 28 April 1995 by Halifax Shipyards Ltd. at Halifax, Nova Scotia, and was launched on 22 January 1996. Glace Bay was commissioned into the Canadian Forces at Sydney, Nova Scotia, on 26 October 1996 and carries the hull number MM 701. In 1997, the coastal defence vessel deployed to the Great Lakes. Following the crash of Swissair Flight 111, Glace Bay was among the vessels sent to search for the downed aircraft in September 1998. The following year, she was sent to the Baltic Sea to participate in minesweeping exercises with NATO.

In November 2009, the Canadian trials for the Boeing Insitu ScanEagle unmanned aircraft system were performed aboard Glace Bay.

In June 2013, Glace Bay and sister ship  were sent on a seven-week tour of the Saint Lawrence Seaway and the Great Lakes, making several port calls along the way. In 2014, she was deployed to serve in Operation Caribbe. During the ship's deployment, in collaboration with the United States Coast Guard, the vessel seized a large shipment of cocaine valued at $84 million. In October 2018, Glace Bay was among the Canadian ships deployed to the North Atlantic and Baltic Sea as part of the large NATO exercise, Trident Juncture. Summerside and Glace Bay took part in the rescue of the four crew members of Makena by a Royal Canadian Air Force Cormorant helicopter, with additional support by a United States C-130 Hercules aircraft.

On 26 January 2020, Glace Bay and  departed Halifax as part of Operation Projection off West Africa. Once there, the two vessels were to take part in two naval exercises Obangame Express and Phoenix Express. They were recalled in March during the COVID-19 pandemic after their exercises were cancelled. They returned to Halifax on 9 April.

In January 2023, Glace Bay and sister ship  sailed from Halifax for operations off West Africa in the Gulf of Guinea, participating in several exercises and diplomatic engagements in the area. However, with the situation in Haiti worsening, the Canadian government redeployed the two ships to the seas off that nation's capital Port-au-Prince for patrols in February.

References

Notes

Citations

Sources

External links

 HMCS Glace Bay (MM 701) – official website

Fleet of the Royal Canadian Navy
Kingston-class coastal defence vessels
1996 ships
Ships built in Nova Scotia